Brackenridgea hookeri is a species of plant in the family Ochnaceae. It is found in India, Malaysia, Singapore, and Thailand.

References

Ochnaceae
Flora of India (region)
Flora of Peninsular Malaysia
Flora of Singapore
Flora of Thailand
Least concern plants
Least concern biota of Asia
Taxonomy articles created by Polbot